"" is a song by Italian singer-songwriter Elisa. Written by Elisa Toffoli and Davide Petrella, the song was released by Universal Music and Island Records on 3 February 2022 as Elisa's entry for the Sanremo Music Festival 2022. "" is produced by Andrea Rigonat. It serves also as the fourth single from Elisa's eleventh studio album, Ritorno al futuro/Back to the Future. Musically, "" is a pop ballad. 

Giulio Rosati directed the music video for "", which shows Elisa in a forest during a sunset. Photography took place primarily in Livorno in Tuscany.

"" won the "Giancarlo Bigazzi" Award for the best musical composition and ranked second overall at the Sanremo Music Festival 2022. It also entered on Italian charts from the 14th place, peaked to 4th place in the second week following its release and was the second most streamed song on Spotify in Italy on the day of its release.

Background and release
"" was written initially in English in 2018 by Elisa herself with singer Davide Petrella and it was produced by Elisa's husband Andrea Rigonat. The song was subsequently translated into Italian between 2018 and 2021. It marked Elisa's second attempt at the Sanremo Music Festival, after winning the Sanremo Music Festival 2001 with the song "". In the Sanremo Music Festival 2022, the song was performed live with an orchestra directed by Will Medini.

Critical reception
"" received widespread acclaim from music critics in Italy upon its release. Gino Castaldo of  noted that "what comes straight and strong from Elisa's song is the emotion of music itself, a form of devotion, of deep and indestructible respect". Subsequently, the journalist finds that "[Elisa's] music makes us fly, high up until we are no longer afraid of [the height], as if life was to learn to believe in beauty through music".  were struck by the song's verses, which they describe as "simple but very beautiful and fitting into the tradition of Italian pop songs". They also observe a positive similarity in the verses with Amedeo Minghi and Mietta's 1990 song "", finding the both songs are love stories with full of promises and optimistic imagery.

Andrea Conti of  appreciates the instrumental use of the piano in the song, highlighting that it is "an intimate, delicate, powerful song". Andrea Laffranchi from  also appreciates both the piano and the strings. Laffranchi also notes that Elisa's voice makes him get goosebumps.

Francesco Chignola of  describes the song as "enchanting" on which "the voice of the Friulian artist moves through a thousand shades with splendid clarity", focusing on the fact that it represents "a hymn to life and feelings that make it worthy of be lived ".

All Music Italia appreciates the text, calling it a "classic" capable of "describing that fullness that only love gives".  was pleasantly impressed "by the Toffoli-Petrella couple" and they described "O forse sei tu" as a poignant pop ballad, a secular prayer that enjoys the favor of forecasts.

Music video 
The official music video of "" was released on 3 February 2022 on Elisa's official YouTube channel. Directed by Guilio Rosati, the music video of the song was recorded in the town of Cecina in Livorno, Tuscany. Rosati explains that the choice of Cecina was dictated by the fact that Elisa intended to make a tribute to the music video of "", with which she won the Sanremo Music Festival 2001. The director notes that in the video of "", Elisa was seen dancing with another human figure. For this new song, he therefore intended to create a dance with light "in order to make everything more etheral" while paying homage to Elisa's 2001 song.

The video starts with a shot on trees in a bush, which is followed by a close up shot of Elisa sitting on a log. Through the video Elisa sings, dances and wanders in the bush during sunset. The video also includes shots after nightfall with shadows dancing on trees. In the end, Elisa reaches to a beach in sunset. She wears a long white dress, designed by the creative director of Valentino, Pierpaolo Piccioli.

Track listing

Credits and personnel
Credits adapted from Schweizer Hitparade and an article on the website of Radio Italia.

 Elisa – vocals, songwriter
 Davide Petrella – writer
 Andrea Rigonat – producer
 Will Medini – orchestra director, mixing of strings

Charts

Weekly charts

Year-end charts

Certifications

Release and radio history

References

2022 songs
2022 singles
Elisa (Italian singer) songs
Songs written by Elisa (Italian singer)
Sanremo Music Festival songs